Yevgeny Kafelnikov was the defending champion and won in the final 6–2, 7–5 against David Prinosil.

Seeds

Draw

Finals

Top half

Bottom half

External links
 Draw

Kremlin Cup
Kremlin Cup